Clementine Barnabet (born ) was an accused American serial killer who was convicted of killing one person and confessed to have killed as many as 35. However, doubt has since been cast on her involvement.

Early life 
Clementine Barnabet is believed to have been born around 1894 in St. Martinville, Louisiana, to Nina Porter and Raymond Barnabet. She had three brothers, one of them named Zepherin. Barnabet's father reportedly abused his family. They moved to Lafayette in 1909.

Murders and investigation 
Professor Vance McLaughlin wrote: "Between 1911 and 1912, in towns along the Southern Pacific railroad line running through Louisiana and Texas, a minimum of twelve African-American families were murdered in their homes. All the murders occurred at night and an axe was used to fracture the skulls of the victims. Only one person, Clementine Barnabet, was ever punished for any of these homicides."

Raymond Barnabet, Clementine's father, was arrested on suspicion of murdering the four-person Andrus family, who had been killed in February 1911 in Lafayette, Louisiana. He was released for insufficient evidence, but re-arrested months later and ultimately convicted of the Andrus murders. His daughter Clementine and son Zepherin both testified against Raymond, claiming he had returned home with bloodied clothes and boasting of the Andrus murders. Raymond's attorneys successfully filed for an appeal, but he was held in jail pending a new trial. 

In November 1911, while Raymond was imprisoned, Norbert and Asima Randall of Lafayette were murdered with their four children in a manner similar to the previous slayings. Clementine lived a few blocks away, and came under suspicion due to blood allegedly found on the fence latch of her house and on clothes found in her bedroom. 

While Clementine and Zepherin were both held in custody, the ax murders of families continued, casting doubt on their involvement.

Arrest and confession 
Barnabet eventually confessed to 35 murders. She explained her connection to the Church of Sacrifice, an offshoot of a Christ's Sanctified Holy Church congregation in Lake Charles, Louisiana. 

Clementine further claimed that a priestess of the Church of Sacrifice had given her and her friends "conjure bags" (a good luck charm found in Hoodoo) that would grant them supernatural powers and make them undetectable to the authorities. This spurred Barnabet into committing her first murder to test whether or not the claim of magical protection was true.

Her confession was described in contemporary reports as "very self-contradictory," such as sometimes claiming to have committed the murders alone and other times to have acted with others. She named many of her alleged accomplices, but none were ever charged with a crime.

Modern analysts have tended to doubt Barnabet's involvement in the murders. In their 2017 book The Man from the Train, authors Bill James and Rachel McCarthy James argue that some, but not all, of the murders were committed by a serial killer named Paul Mueller, with others committed by copycats. Other than the fact that she had purchased conjure bags from a specific person, they write, "nothing that Clementine said about the murders (a) can be confirmed by any other party, or (b) has the ring of truth about it. A great deal of what she said is demonstrably false."

Sentencing and disappearance 
In October 1912, Clementine Barnabet was sentenced to life in Louisiana State Penitentiary. In July 1913, she escaped jail for a few hours, but was caught. 

However, in August 1923, Barnabet was released from prison after an unspecified surgical operation was believed to have cured her (not a lobotomy, which was unknown in the United States until a decade later). James and James argue that, "if authorities had actually believed that she was behind these terrible murders, it is unlikely that she would have been released after a few years in jail. She was turned loose so soon because the authorities didn't believe her story, either."

After Barnabet's release, no knowledge exists on her whereabouts.

See also 
 Axeman of New Orleans
 List of serial killers in the United States
 List of serial killers by number of victims

References 

1890s births
1911 murders in the United States
1912 murders in the United States
20th-century African-American people
20th-century African-American women
20th-century American criminals
American people convicted of murder
American prisoners sentenced to life imprisonment
Axe murder
Crimes involving Satanism or the occult
Criminals from Louisiana
People from St. Martinville, Louisiana
People convicted of murder by Louisiana
Prisoners sentenced to life imprisonment by Louisiana
Suspected serial killers
Year of death missing